Downtown Greensboro Historic District is a national historic district located at Greensboro, Guilford County, North Carolina.  The district encompasses 96 contributing buildings in the central business district of Greensboro. The commercial buildings were built between about 1885 and the 1930s in a variety of popular architectural styles including Italianate and Art Deco. Located in the district is the separately listed Jefferson Standard Building.  Other notable buildings include the Vanstory Building (c. 1885), Kress Building (1929), Woolworth's (c. 1929), Efrid's Department Store (c. 1930), Montgomery Ward (1936), the Carolina Theatre (1927), Center Theatre (1948), the former Belk Building (1939), Ellis Stone/Thalhimer's Department  Store (1949-1950), and the former American Exchange National Bank Building (1920). The Woolworth's store is notable as the site of the Greensboro sit-ins of 1960.

It was listed on the National Register of Historic Places in 1982, with a reevaluation in 2003.

Gallery

References

Commercial buildings on the National Register of Historic Places in North Carolina
Historic districts on the National Register of Historic Places in North Carolina
Italianate architecture in North Carolina
Art Deco architecture in North Carolina
Buildings and structures in Greensboro, North Carolina
National Register of Historic Places in Guilford County, North Carolina